Val-de-la-Haye is a commune in the Seine-Maritime department in the Normandy region in north-western France.

Geography
A car ferry connects with the commune of Petit-Couronne on the opposite bank.

Heraldry

Population

Places of interest
 The church of St. Jean-Baptiste, dating from the twentieth century.
 Vestiges of the thirteenth-century Templars' Sainte-Vaubourg commandery.
 A commemorative stone column topped with a bronze eagle, built in 1846.

See also
Communes of the Seine-Maritime department

References

External links

Official town website 

Communes of Seine-Maritime